Scalene may refer to:

 A scalene triangle, one in which all sides and angles are not the same.
 A scalene ellipsoid, one in which the lengths of all three semi-principal axes are different
 Scalene muscles of the neck
 Scalene tubercle, a slight ridge on the first rib prolonged internally into a tubercle